Rogówek may refer to the following places in Poland:
Rogówek, Kłodzko County in Lower Silesian Voivodeship (south-west Poland)
Rogówek, Wołów County in Lower Silesian Voivodeship (south-west Poland)
Rogówek, Podlaskie Voivodeship (north-east Poland)
Rogówek, Świętokrzyskie Voivodeship (south-central Poland)
Rogówek, Masovian Voivodeship (east-central Poland)